Korada Ramachandra Sastri (12 October 1815 – 11 August 1900) was an Indian poet and playwright in Sanskrit and Telugu. He was the first known original Telugu playwright. His Manjarimadhukariam is the first Telugu drama with an original concept.  
His Sanskrit lyric poem Ghanavrttam is a sequel to Kalidasa's Meghaduta. Ramachandra Sastri authored more than thirty works in Sanskrit and Telugu  but only a few books are extant.  His books give us an appreciation of the advanced poetic and linguistic aspects of his literary works.

Sanskrit books

Telugu books

Sanskrit to Telugu translations

References

1815 births
1900 deaths
Telugu-language dramatists and playwrights
Sanskrit dramatists and playwrights
19th-century Indian dramatists and playwrights
Place of birth missing

External links